Muhamad Firly (born 16 July 1999) is an Indonesian professional footballer who plays as a centre back for Liga 1 club Barito Putera.

Club career

Barito Putera
He was signed for Barito Putera to play in Liga 1 in the 2021 season. Firly made his league debut on 23 September 2021 in a match against Persikabo 1973 at the Wibawa Mukti Stadium, Cikarang.

International career
In October 2021, Firly was called up to the Indonesia U23 in a friendly match against Tajikistan and Nepal and also prepared for 2022 AFC U-23 Asian Cup qualification in Tajikistan by Shin Tae-yong.

Career statistics

Club

Notes

Honours

International 
Indonesia U-19
 AFF U-19 Youth Championship third place: 2018

References

External links
 Muhamad Firly at Soccerway
 Muhamad Firly at Liga Indonesia

1999 births
Living people
People from Depok
Indonesian footballers
PS Barito Putera players
Liga 1 (Indonesia) players
Indonesia youth international footballers
Association football central defenders
Sportspeople from West Java